Hasanov (masculine,  ("belonging to Həsən")) and Hasanova (feminine) is an Azerbaijani, Uzbek and Tajik surname. It is slavicized from the Arabic male given name Hassan. It may refer to:

Hasanov

Ali Hasanov (born 1976), Azerbaijani artist, musician and filmmaker
Ali S. Hasanov (born 1948), Azerbaijani politician
Aliagha Hasanov (1871–1933), Azerbaijani statesman
Elkhan Hasanov (born 1967), Azerbaijani goalkeeper
Faiq Hasanov (born 1940), Azerbaijani chess player
Gayratjon Hasanov (born 1983), Uzbek footballer
Gotfrid Hasanov (1900–1965), Russian composer of Lezgian descent
Hasan Hasanov (born 1940), Azerbaijani politician and diplomat
Huseyn Hasanov (born 1986), paralympian athlete from Azerbaijan
Jabrayil Hasanov (born 1990), Azerbaijani wrestler
Karam Hasanov (born 1969), Azerbaijani politician
Khurshed Hasanov (born 1973), Tajikistani boxer
Mohammed Hasanov (born 1959), Azerbaijani military personnel
Namig Hasanov (born 1979), Azerbaijani footballer
Rahim Hasanov (born 1983), Azerbaijani football referee
Ramil Hasanov (born 1996), Ukrainian footballer
Ramin Hasanov (born 1977), Azerbaijani diplomat
Ramiz Hasanov (born 1961), Azerbaijani politician
Rashad Hasanov (born 1985), Azerbaijani democracy activist
Samir Hasanov (born 1967), former Soviet and Ukrainian footballer
Sardar Hasanov (born 1985), Azerbaijani weightlifter
Sayavush Hasanov (1964–1992), Azerbaijani military personnel 
Tabriz Hasanov (born 1967), Azerbaijani footballer
Tahir Hasanov (1970–1992), Azerbaijani military personnel
Zakir Hasanov (born 1959), Azerbaijani politician

Hasanova
Alla Hasanova (born 1970), Azerbaijani volleyball player
Gulkhar Hasanova (1918–2005), Azerbaijani mugham opera singer
Lala Hasanova (born 1978), Azerbaijani-Russian science fiction writer and lawyer of Jewish ancestry
Olena Hasanova (born 1995), Ukrainian-born Azerbaijani volleyball player 
Shamama Hasanova (1923–2008), Azerbaijani cotton grower and politician
Südaba Hasanova (born 1947), Azerbaijani magistrate
Zamina Hasanova (1918–2006), Azerbaijani metallurgist

See also
Hassan (surname)
Hassan
Həsənli (disambiguation)
Hasanova, Karayazı

References

Azerbaijani-language surnames
Uzbek-language surnames
Tajik-language surnames
Patronymic surnames
Surnames from given names